Afghan pul (plural: puls); ;  is the 1⁄100 (one-hundredth) subdivision of the Afghan afghani which is the currency of Afghanistan. All pul coins have been demonetized.

History
Till 1925, the currency of Afghanistan was Afghan rupee which was subdivided into paisa. In 1925, the Afghan rupee was replaced by Afghan afghani as its official currency. One Afghan afghani is subdivided into 100 puls. At the time of introduction, a pul coin was made of copper and weighed one gram. However, a 10 pul coin weighed 6 grams.

See also
 Afghan rupee

References 

Currencies of Afghanistan
Currencies introduced in 1925